= World Cup Korea =

World Cup Korea may refer to:

- the 2002 FIFA World Cup of Korea and Japan.
- the 2007 FIFA U-17 World Cup of Korea Republic.
- the 2017 FIFA U-20 World Cup of Korea Republic.
